Aboite is an unincorporated community in Lafayette Township, Allen County, in the U.S. state of Indiana.

History
Aboite was originally settled as a train stop at the intersection of the Toledo, Wabash & Western Railway with Aboite Road. The community's name is derived from the French word for "minnow". A post office was established at Aboite in 1833, and remained in operation until it was discontinued in 1921.

Geography

References

Unincorporated communities in Allen County, Indiana
Unincorporated communities in Indiana
Fort Wayne, IN Metropolitan Statistical Area